The Union for the Development of the Comoros (UPDC) is a political alliance in the Comoros. The party's president is Mohamed Halifa.

History
The UPDC was established in February 2013 as an alliance of parties that supported President Ikililou Dhoinine. It was initially named the Rally for Democracy in the Comoros (Rassemblement pour la Démocratie aux Comoros, Radeco), but was later renamed Union for the Development of the Comoros.

In the 2015 parliamentary elections the UPDC emerged as the largest party, winning eight of the 24 directly-elected seats.

References

Political party alliances in the Comoros
2013 establishments in the Comoros
Political parties established in 2013